Hello Happiness is the twelfth studio album by American singer Chaka Khan, released on February 15, 2019. It is her first new material since 2007's Funk This. It includes the 2018 single "Like Sugar", and the second single, the title track "Hello Happiness". "Hello Happiness" was first performed at the 2019 Rose Parade in Pasadena, California. The front cover photograph is Khan at 8525 Sepulveda Boulevard, Los Angeles, California.

Background
Khan stated that she did not stop making music following the release of Funk This, but "simply stopped releasing material", and also needed time to recover following the death of recording artist Prince in 2016, which she has said made her "rethink" herself and admit herself into rehab for addiction to prescription drugs.

Music
The album features both a "contemporary" feeling as well as "strong echoes of the past, such as the late '70s New York disco scene". About the lyrics of the title track, Khan said: "I think we need a shot of just not taking the little things so seriously. Little things are important. It's about the little things, but just flow." Khan co-wrote all the tracks on the album.

Critical reception

Hello Happiness received generally favorable reviews from music critics. At Metacritic, which assigns a normalized rating out of 100 to reviews from mainstream critics, the album has an average score of 68 based on 6 reviews, indicating "generally favorable reviews".

Track listing

Charts

Release history

References

2019 albums
Chaka Khan albums
Island Records albums